Peggy Nadramia (born Margaret Nadramia) is an American magazine editor and administrator in the Church of Satan, of which she is the current High Priestess, and in which she is known as Maga Nadramia, as well as the wife of current church head Peter H. Gilmore.

Works 
 Narcopolis & Other Poems edited by Peggy Nadramia (Hell's Kitchen Productions, Nov 1989); an anthology of macabre poetry with illustrations by several artists.

She was also editor of the influential little magazine of horror fiction and related matter, Grue, 1985–1999.

See also 
 Satanism: An interview with Church of Satan High Priest Peter Gilmore

References 
 Footage of an interview with Gilmore and Nadramia for KK Magazine is included on the Church of Satan Interview Archive DVD .

External links 
 Text of Barton's appointment of Nadramia as Magistra Templi Rex
 My Dark, Satanic Love by Magistra Nadramia
 Satanism, Nazism and Fascism by Peggy Nadramia

American magazine editors
Women magazine editors
Living people
American LaVeyan Satanists
Satanist religious leaders
Journalists from New York City
Year of birth missing (living people)